Eugene Benton Sperling (born December 24, 1958) is an American lawyer who was director of the National Economic Council and assistant to the president for economic policy under Presidents Bill Clinton and Barack Obama. He is the only person to serve as national economic advisor under two presidents.  Outside of government, he founded the Center for Universal Education at the Brookings Institution in 2002.

In February 2021, as the nomination of Neera Tanden for OMB director faced opposition, Sperling was considered to be one of the leading contenders to assume the top position.

He authored Economic Dignity, which was released on May 5, 2020.

Sperling currently serves as Senior Advisor to President Biden and Implementation Coordinator of the American Rescue Plan.

Early life and education 
Sperling was born in Ann Arbor, Michigan, the son of Doris Louise (née Hyman) and Lawrence Sperling. He is of Jewish descent. He attended Pioneer High School and then Community High School from which he graduated. In 1982, he graduated with a B.A. in political science from the University of Minnesota where he was captain of the Men's Varsity Tennis Team. In 1985 he graduated with a Juris Doctor from Yale Law School where he served as a senior editor of the Yale Law Journal. While at Yale Law School, he worked for future Labor Secretary Robert Reich. After graduating from Yale Law School, he attended the Wharton School of the University of Pennsylvania and worked as an economic adviser on Michael Dukakis' campaign.

Prior to joining the National Economic Council, Sperling served as deputy director of economic policy for the presidential transition and economic policy director of the Clinton-Gore presidential campaign. From 1990 to 1992, he was an economic advisor to Governor Mario Cuomo of New York.

Career

Clinton administration 
Sperling served as deputy director (from 1993 to 1996) and then director (from 1996 to 2001) of the National Economic Council during the Clinton administration. As deputy director from 1993 to 1996, Sperling helped design and pass several of President Clinton's early initiatives, including 1993 Deficit Reduction Act, the major expansion of the Earned Income Tax Credit, and the Direct Student Loan Act.

As director from 1996 to 2001, Sperling was a principal negotiator of the 1997 bipartisan Balanced Budget Act, which included the creation of the Children's Health Insurance Program.  He reportedly held up the final negotiation to ensure that the design of the child tax credit would lead to bigger payments for lower-income families on the Earned Income Tax Credit. He also played a leading role in the design and passage of other Clinton administration economic initiatives, including the Hope Scholarship Tax Credit, the New Markets Tax Credit, the Children's Health Insurance Program, the Gear-UP Early College Mentoring program, expanded debt relief to poor nations, and stronger international protections against abusive child labor. He was the architect of the Save Social Security First budget strategy, and co-negotiated the final week of the China WTO agreement in Beijing in 1999 with United States Trade Representative Charlene Barshefsky. Sperling worked with then-Treasury Secretary Lawrence Summers to negotiate protections for the Community Reinvestment Act in the Financial Modernization Act of 1999, also known as the Gramm–Leach–Bliley Act. These protections helped secure passage of the bill. Sperling represented the U.S. government and gave a keynote address at the World Education Forum in Dakar, Senegal in 2000, where the world committed to the second millennium development goal of universal primary education.

Post-Clinton administration 
After leaving the Clinton Administration, Sperling focused on promoting universal education, particularly for girls in poor and developing nations. In 2002, he founded the Center for Universal Education at the Council on Foreign Relations and the Brookings Institution and served as its first executive director for seven years from 2002 to 2008. In that role, Sperling advocated for a global compact for education for all children, with publications on universal education for all nations in Foreign Affairs, The New York Times, Washington Post, Financial Times, Los Angeles Times, and IMF Quarterly: Finance and Development. He also authored concept papers for the Education for All Fast Track Initiative on Closing the Trust Gaps: Unlocking Financing for Education in Fragile State and How to Unlock Financing for Fragile States and Move Toward a More Unified Global Architecture for Education Financing: Eight Preliminary Recommendations. Sperling was a member of U.N. Millennium Task Force on Girls' Education.

In 2003, Sperling also founded the Global Campaign for Education-US, a broad-based coalition of national and community-based organizations, international NGOs, teacher unions, faith-based groups, and think tanks dedicated to ensuring universal quality education for all children.  The organization's mission is "to promote education as a basic human right and mobilize to create political will in the United States and internationally to ensure universal quality education."

In 2004, he co-authored the book What Works in Girls' Education: Evidence and Policies from the Developing World with Barbara Herz. In addition, Sperling was also a senior fellow at the Center for American Progress, and authored The Pro-Growth Progressive: An Economic Strategy for Shared Prosperity in that role. For four years, he was a consultant and had partial writing credit for four episodes for the television series The West Wing. Sperling is the author of the 2020 book Economic Dignity, building on a 2019 piece he published in Democracy Journal.

Sperling was a top economic adviser for Hillary Clinton during her 2008 presidential campaign.

Prior to joining the Obama administration, Sperling earned $887,727 from Goldman Sachs in 2008 for his work helping to create and implement their 10,000 Women charitable initiative, which funds business education for women in developing nations. He was also compensated $158,000 for speeches, mostly to financial companies. Sperling received $2.2 million in total compensation in 2008 from a variety of consulting jobs, board seats, speaking fees and fellowships.

Obama administration 

From 2009 to 2011, Sperling served as a counselor to Treasury Secretary Timothy Geithner. He advised on responding to the financial crisis, was a member of the Obama Auto Rescue Task Force, was Geithner's top aide on fiscal, budget, tax, and small business issues, and coordinated the Treasury efforts on design and passage of the Affordable Care Act. Sperling was a leading advocate in the administration for increasing refundable tax credits for working families, extending unemployment benefits, adding restrictions on executive compensation for companies receiving public funds, and proposing a fee on major financial institutions. Sperling was reported to have been one of the key members of the administration to advocate to President Obama that he save Chrysler. Sperling is credited with designing the Small Business Jobs Act of 2010, which created a $30 billion fund for loans and the State Small Business Credit Initiative.

In January 2011, President Barack Obama appointed Sperling as the director of the National Economic Council, Sperling's second tenure in that position. 
In that role, Sperling played a key role representing the White House in budget negotiations with Congress as well as serving as the White House point person on several of the president's top priorities including job creation, manufacturing policy, housing, GSE reform, and skills initiatives. He was credited with being the key architect of the $447 billion American Jobs Act and he led the Obama Administration's Detroit rescue task force in 2013, which mobilized $300 million to support Detroit. Sperling also led the design and implementation of the president's initiatives on supporting workers facing long-term unemployment, Manufacturing Innovation Hubs, SelectUSA, the College Opportunity Summit, and the ConnectED initiative. According to Robert Greenstein, president of the Center on Budget and Policy Priorities, "If you look at key budget legislation – in 1993, 1997, 2009, 2010 or 2012 – there is no administration official who did more over the past 20 years to dramatically expand tax credits for low-income workers, with the result that these credits now lift 10 million people out of poverty."

Sperling was named one of the 100 Most Powerful People in Finance worldwide in 2013 by Worth Magazine. He was named one of the 50 Most Powerful People in Washington by GQ in 2012.

Sperling left the National Economic Council in March 2014.

Two years after Sperling left the White House, a ProPublica article reported that he had taken loans totaling between $300,000 and $600,000 from Howard Shapiro, a lawyer at Wilmer Cutler Pickering Hale and Dorr, between 2011 and 2013. Shapiro has been Sperling's closest friend since they were housemates at Yale Law School in 1983. Sperling stated that when his savings were depleted, he "took personal loans from my very closest friend of more than 30 years so that I could afford to remain in public service without having to sell our house when we had only two more years left with both of our children at home." His house in Washington, D.C. was valued at "around $2 million."

A White House spokesperson said that every loan had been "reviewed and cleared by White House Counsel and the Office of Government Ethics" and that "no issue came before Sperling that prompted him to recuse himself." Kenneth Gross, a partner at Skadden, Arps, Slate, Meagher & Flom who specializes in federal gift and gratuity rules, stated that the fact that the loans were disclosed and cleared by the ethics office "takes the guy off the hook. What more is he supposed to do?"

The ProPublica article stated that Sperling "played a role" in a federal and state government settlement with five major financial institutions over foreclosure and mortgage servicing abuses, and that WilmerHale was "one of many law firms involved in negotiating the settlement," though it did not state that Shapiro was involved in the settlement. Sperling told ProPublica he was not involved in the negotiations and only "helped decide that settlement money would go toward reducing principal on mortgages for borrowers whose homes were worth less than their mortgages." The Financial Times reported that Sperling met with groups such as the National Association for the Advancement of Colored People (NAACP) to persuade them of the benefits the deal would have for borrowers.

Biden administration 
On March 15, 2021, President Joe Biden announced that Sperling was selected to oversee the roll-out of the newly signed $1.9 trillion American Rescue Plan Act of 2021.

Personal life
Sperling is married to television writer Allison Abner, whom he met when he was a consultant on NBC's The West Wing. They have a daughter, Nina, and a son, Miles.

Works

Notes

References

External links
 

"The Pro-Growth Progressive" - Gene Sperling speaks at Google
Obama appointee Sperling was key H-1B broker, Computerworld, January 11, 2011

|-

1958 births
Living people
21st-century American economists
Biden administration personnel
Center for American Progress people
Clinton administration personnel
Economists from Michigan
Goldman Sachs people
Jewish American government officials
Obama administration personnel
People from Ann Arbor, Michigan
Senior Advisors to the President of the United States
University of Minnesota College of Liberal Arts alumni
Wharton School of the University of Pennsylvania alumni
Yale Law School alumni